Hela is a fictional character appearing in American comic books published by Marvel Comics. She is based on the goddess Hel from Norse mythology, and was first adapted by Stan Lee and Jack Kirby in Journey into Mystery #102. Hela is the Asgardian Goddess of Death who serves as the ruler of Hel and Niflheim. The character is usually depicted as an adversary of the superhero Thor.

Hela made her live-action debut in the Marvel Cinematic Universe film Thor: Ragnarok (2017), portrayed by Cate Blanchett.

Publication history

Hela was adapted from Norse myths by Stan Lee and Jack Kirby, and first appeared in Journey into Mystery #102 (March 1964).

Fictional character biography
Hela was born in Jotunheim, the land of the giants. She is the child of Loki (albeit a different incarnation who died during a previous Asgardian Ragnarok) and the giantess Angrboða. When she came of age, Odin appointed her as the Goddess of the Dead, giving her rulership over the dead in the realms of Hel and Niflheim.

Queen of Hel
Hela often tried to expand her power to the dead who dwell in Valhalla as well. These attempts often brought Hela into conflict with Odin or his son Thor. She once appeared to Thor while he was on the verge of death after battling the Wrecker, who knocked a building onto him while he was depowered. She failed to tempt Thor into entering Valhalla, despite an image of one that dwelled there.

Later, she stole a portion of the sleeping Odin's soul while he was on the Sea of Eternal Night due to Loki planning to take over Asgard, thus creating a powerful entity known as Infinity. Hela then unleashed Infinity upon the universe. Infinity even took control of Odin. Hela slew Thor, who was restored to life by the sacrifice of her servant, the Silent One. Hela was then slain by Odin to save Thor, but then returned to life by Odin after being convinced by Thor to restore the natural balance of life and death. Hela slew Thor after tracking him down by putting humans in danger, but restored him to life after Sif offered to die in his place.

Hela later battled the Olympian Death-god Pluto for the right to claim Odin's soul, as Odin had been killed by the monster Mangog. As a result, Hela restored Odin to life to prevent Pluto from claiming him. Some time later, Hela confronted Thor. Some time after that, she confronted Odin. She then plotted with Loki to bring about Ragnarök by slaying the god Balder then attacking Asgard. She summoned Volla's spirit before this to tell her and Loki about Ragnarok, after which she prepared an army of monsters to attack Asgard. However Odin used his powers to prevent Balder dying. Later Balder was restored after the Asgardian's death and resurrection battling the Celestials.

Hela then summoned the Valkyrie to aid in a war against Ollerus, while Hela encountered the other Defenders. Hela was then forced to join a conspiracy of Loki and Tyr against Odin. She also unwillingly entered an alliance with the death-gods of other Earth pantheons, joining their realms together to create a vast hell. As a result, she was destroyed and devoured along with other Death-gods by Demogorge the God-Eater, though it happened to her last, who was wakened by the joining, but was restored to life with Demogorge's defeat.

Hela later allied with Malekith, and took souls of Earth mortals to Hel using special food of the faerie. She then appeared in Asgard to claim Odin's soul, but was driven off by Thor. She encountered the X-Men and New Mutants in Asgard. She appeared to claim Wolverine's soul, but was driven off by the X-Men and Mirage. Hel was then invaded by Thor, Balder, the Executioner, and the Einherjar to rescue the captive mortal souls. Hela wrestled Thor for the captive mortal souls. Hela raised an army of the dead to stop Thor's escape from Hel.

During this fight with Thor, in revenge for his defiance and invasion of her realm, Hela cursed Thor with a dark form of eternal life, making him incapable of dying while also making his bones weak and brittle so that they would break more easily and wouldn't heal from the damage inflicted, Hela reflecting in satisfaction at the image of Thor coming to long for death while she refuses to grant it. Hela then contested against Mephisto who attempted to possess Thor's soul. Thor creates special mystical armor as protection, but after battling and defeating the Midgard Serpent, his body is pulverized into jelly. Thor eventually forces Hela to lift the curse by using the Destroyer as his host body to invade Hel, forcing Hela to restore his body to life and health before he could destroy her.

From time to time, Odin would enter a magical sleep in order to bolster his powers. It was during one of these sleeps that Hela made a plan for power. She corrupted the Valkyries, mentally and physically, transforming them into fire-demons. This also included Danielle Moonstar, of the New Mutants, who was on Earth at the time, who Hela set against the New Mutants. Dani and her team were eventually brought over to Asgard. Hela sent the Valkyries against the dwarves and New Mutants in Asgard. The New Mutants skirmished with Hela's forces again and again, even rescuing the prisoner Hrimhari, a wolf-prince from a far away land. Hela forced the dwarf Eitri to forge a sword of Asgardian metal "uru". One of Hela's spells split the group. This resulted in a more efficient recruitment of resistance force, which included the Warriors Three. Hela sent Mirage to kill the sleeping Odin. While most of the Asgardian forces battled Hela's soldiers, the mutants ventured to Odin's very bedchambers, saved Odin's life and foiled Hela's plans. Hela was defeated when the uru sword was destroyed.

Conflict with various forces brought Bruce Banner, also known as the Hulk, and Agamemnon, the leader of the Pantheon, to Hela's realm. After an undetermined time fighting Hela's skeletal forces, Agamemnon pleaded, based on a vaguely hinted upon relationship, to allow the two to leave. Hela relented, reluctantly.

Hela on Earth
Hela was awakened from her mortal guise after Ragnarök by Thor, albeit due to Loki's machinations. She now lives in Las Vegas, maintaining a lair where she can feed on the souls of random unlucky people, and agrees to use her powers to aid Loki in bringing him back in time to Asgard to complete his own sinister plans for Asgard.

She is seen attending a meeting with Mephisto, Blackheart, Satannish and Dormammu about a disturbance created by the newly resurrected Magik, who is looking for the soulsword and the original Bloodstone amulet. Belasco's daughter, Witchfire appears during the meeting and reveals she is now the current owner of the original amulet and vows to take her father's place as ruler of Limbo and seat at their table.

When Norman Osborn attempts to subdue the X-Men, Cyclops sends Danielle Moonstar to Las Vegas where she approaches Hela for a boon. Hela warns her that the price of the boon is a heavy one, but Dani accepts, requesting "a new ride home and a big ol' sword." Later, Hela is summoned to Utopia by Hrimhari to save a pregnant Rahne and their child, which is neither human nor mutant. Faced with a moral dilemma, to save his child or Rahne; Hrimhari asks Hela to restore Elixir to full health so Elixir may heal them both and to take him instead. Hela agrees and takes Hrimhari away.

Siege of Asgard
During the Siege of Asgard Loki appears before Hela asking if she has made arrangements for the dead. Hela points out she is without a Hel so she cannot take them in and plans to let the dead wander Midgard forever. Loki provides her with proof of the Disir, banished, cannibalistic Valkyries who once belonged to Bor whom he cursed for dining on the flesh of other Asgardians to only be able to feed on the souls of gods. Using his extraordinary swordsmanship skills Loki was able to make a group of 13 submit to him. Meeting with Mephisto, Loki strikes up a deal granting a portion of his netherworld to Hela for one thousand and one years, as her new Hel. In exchange for this, Hela erases Loki from the Books of Hel, thus he is no longer tied to Hel or Asgard, gaining absolute freedom. Unknown to Hela, Loki had manipulated these events in his favor as he had the Disir in his services and had leased them out to Mephisto for one hundred and one days after demonstrating their skill to the demon lord. Hela summons Danielle Moonstar to repay her debt and to gather the spirits of the Asgardians that fell in battle with Norman Osborn's forces as quickly as possible so they do not fall prey to the Disir.

The Disir, still hungry, attack Hela's new Hel as it was not the true Hel they were banished from. Sensing the Disir's assault on the dead Asgardians, Hela attempts to protect them using the sword Eir-Gram, but she is disarmed and her arm sliced off brutally. Hela is quickly overwhelmed and her own remaining power insufficient to counter theirs. Absorbing the dead into her body, Hela creates a fortress around herself to protect them and asks Thor for help through the recently deceased body of an Asgardian. With the help of Thor and Tyr, they manage to slay and banish the remaining Disir, whose souls are claimed by the triumphant Mephisto.

Avengers Prime
In the aftermath of the Siege of Asgard, Captain America, Iron Man, and Thor are mysteriously drawn into one of the other Nine Realms, eventually revealed to be the Hel-realm of Hela. Thor, after a fierce struggle with the Enchantress, engages in open combat with the Nightsword-armed Hela, and though managing to hold his own against her and her forces for some time, ultimately falls to her immense and evidently vastly enhanced power. Amora, after teleporting herself and Hela away to save Thor's life, herself challenges Hela using all her strength, but Hela defeats her twice in quick succession, attempts and fails to destroy Mjolnir, despite summoning Bor himself to her aid, and apparently slays the Enchantress after revealing that she now wields the Twilight Sword of Surtur.

After Thor reunites with Iron Man and Captain America, he manages to persuade many of his former Asgardian enemies into rallying behind him into an army against Hela and her own forces. Hela attacks Thor and his allies, defeating and nearly slaying him with the power of the Twilight Sword, but the Enchantress intervenes and saves him, teleporting him away to re-claim Mjolnir and using her own powers to help Thor fight Hela. Thor ultimately manages to claim the Twilight Sword and uses it to restore the Nine Worlds back to their former harmony and order while banishing Hela, but refuses to set Asgard back into the sky, as Amora asks, claiming that using such unholy power for his own ends would make him the same as Hela herself. A grateful and healed Amora then returns Thor and his friends back to Midgard after Thor promises her that her allegiance will not be forgotten.

Chaos War
During the Chaos War storyline, Hela breaks into Pluto's throne room in the Underworld to warn him of Amatsu-Mikaboshi's army of thousands of alien deities decimating the death realms, joining forces with him in a desperate and a seemingly futile attempt to repel the massive assault on their domains. Hela, along with Pluto, Satannish, and many other rulers of Earth's various netherworlds, are shown to be slaves of the Chaos King after he obliterates the realms of Hell itself.

"Fear Itself"
During the 2011 "Fear Itself" storyline, Cyclops sends Danielle Moonstar to what is left of Las Vegas (after what Juggernaut in the form of Kuurth: Breaker of Stone did to it) to look for Hela while the X-Men fight Kuurth. Hela had taken to living in a Las Vegas casino. When Moonstar does find Hela, she teleports Moonstar to Hel in order to defend it. When her teammates try to invoke a dark magic to summon a portal to follow Danielle, they end up in Hell instead of Hel. They encounter Mephisto, who says that he will get them to Hel if Magma goes out with him.

Queen No More
Following the death of her lover, Sera, Angela petitions Hela to free her soul. When Hela refuses, Angela launches a campaign to conquer her realm, assisted by Hela's handmaiden, Leah. Angela eventually succeeds in besting Hela and takes her crown, becoming the new queen. However, she quickly abdicates her position and installs Balder as the ruler of Hel, while a bound Hela is taken prisoner.

A greatly weakened Hela later escapes captivity and makes her way to the Triskelion on Earth, where Thanos has been imprisoned after a recent battle with the Ultimates. Disguising her identity with a full hooded robe, she proposes an alliance with Thanos and is tasked with bringing him the Mjolnir of an alternate universe version of Thor as tribute. Accompanied by Proxima Midnight and Black Swan, Hela travels to the Collector's fortress, where the hammer is being held. There, the trio battle Thor and Beta Ray Bill, and fail in retrieving the hammer. Upon returning to Thanos, Hela reveals her true identity and easily defeats both Black Swan and Proxima Midnight to demonstrate her power. She then tells Thanos that she needs his help to reclaim rule of Hel, and offers to grant him the death he has long been seeking in exchange. Hela then kisses Thanos in a passionate embrace.

Powers and abilities
Although Hela is classified as an Asgardian and has the physical stature of an Asgardian, her actual heritage is as a full blooded giant of Jötunheimr, even though both races share similar attributes. Hela possesses attributes common to Asgardian gods. She possesses superhuman strength, speed, stamina, agility, reflexes and durability at levels far surpassing those of the vast majority of either race. Her vast strength has allowed her to engage in sustained hand-to-hand combat with Thor. Like all Asgardians she has resistance to magic.

Hela has vast mystical powers which she can use for various effects like limitless astral projection while retaining many of her powers and abilities, firing deadly bolts of energy from her hands which can age or even kill Asgardians, levitation and the creation of illusions, she can manipulate the dark magic. Her most powerful ability is her Hand of Glory, a technique that uses mystical energy to enhance the strength of her punch to kill even an Asgardian.

As a Death Goddess, Hela has a pact with Death, allowing her to claim the souls of any worshipper of the Asgardians and the Asgardians themselves and take them to Hel or Niflheim, as well as able to travel nearly anywhere within the Nine Worlds in an instant. While Hela's touch is fatal to mortals as well and she is capable of stealing their souls into Hel, she generally did not claim the souls of mortal heroes unless she finds their souls particularly appealing, leaving that task to the Valkyries who took the souls of heroes to Valhalla. Hela is usually willing to wait until a person has died before claiming the soul, but she can kill a healthy human or even Asgardian with a single touch, her "touch of death." Hela is also willing to use her illusions to kill living Asgardians. Hela also has the ability to restore a dead Asgardian to life provided their spirits have not passed on to the afterlife, but she rarely used these abilities.

Hela always wears her magical cloak which enhances her strength and keeps her young and healthy. The goddess has jet black hair and bright green eyes. Without the cloak, Hela reverts to her true form: in this form half of her body is healthy and beautiful, while the other half is decaying, though it appears alive and beautifully healthy while she wears her cloak. Without the cloak Hela is very weak and can barely move, and her powers are greatly reduced; she is unable to levitate or even stand, and cannot project mystical bolts. Hela doesn't need to wear the cloak; simply touching it is enough to restore her to her stronger form.

Hela is often armed with her "Nightsword," and is a proficient swordswoman.

Hela can command all of the dead who dwell in Hel and Niflheim, but she has no power over the dead in Valhalla.

Reception

Accolades 

 In 2018, CBR.com ranked Hela 9th in their "10 Most Powerful Villains In The MCU" list.
 In 2018, CBR.com ranked Hela 5th in their "20 Most Physically Powerful MCU Villains" list.
 In 2018, Screen Rant ranked Hela 21st in their "Marvel Vs DC: The 30 Most Powerful Villains" list.
 In 2021, Looper ranked Hela 12th in their "Strongest Supervillains In History" list.
 In 2021, CBR.com ranked Hela 8th in their "10 Strongest Female Gods" list.
 In 2022, The A.V. Club ranked Hela 42nd in their "100 best Marvel characters" list.
 In 2022, CBR.com ranked Hela 4th in their "10 Strongest Female Villains" list.
 In 2022, IGN ranked Hela 2nd in their "Most Powerful Characters in the Marvel Cinematic Universe: The Villains" list.
 In 2022, SlashFilm ranked Hela 9th in their "Most Powerful Aliens In The MCU" list.
 In 2022, SlashFilm ranked Hela 10th in their "Most Powerful MCU Villains" list.

Other versions

Marvel 2099
In the Marvel 2099 series of stories, the megacorporation Alchemax tried transforming people into false versions of the Norse Aesir in order to gain advantage of the worldwide worship of these beings. A supporting character in Ravage 2099 named Tiana, the love interest of the titular hero, was turned into Hela via technological means for this project.

Ultimate Marvel

In the Ultimate Marvel universe, Thor travels to Valhalla in order to retrieve the soul of the deceased Valkyrie. Hela tells him that if he manages to defeat her army, she will revive Valkyrie, but for a price. In Ultimatum #3, after her army is defeated, she reveals that the price is Thor's soul. He agrees, and the souls of both Valkyrie and the also-deceased Captain America are released.

She appears in Ultimate Comics: New Ultimates, telling Thor she will release him in exchange for giving her a son. The next issue has a vision shown to Valkyrie by Amora where Thor is having sex with Hela, as he had no other choice. Thor then demands his freedom, however he is informed another deed is still required to release him. Thor, being incapable of killing Hela, is released instead by Valkyrie who is killed in battle with the Defenders, who now have superpowers due to Loki's intervention. After she discovers that Thor had murdered their son, Modi, Hela displayed an immense fit of rage; Thor explained to her that Modi had been corrupted by the World Tree and that he had been left with no other option.

X-Men: The End
In X-Men: The End, an alternative reality focusing on the alternate future of the X-Men, Danielle Moonstar is separated and held in confinement in the mutant concentration camp Neverland situated on the Moon when Hela appears before her. Near death from torture and confinement, Moonstar's struggling pleas are only heard by Hela. Materializing before Moonstar, Hela reminds her that she is a Valkyrie and as such, cherished by the Goddess of Death. After Moonstar invokes both Asgardian and Cheyenne chants, Hela revives her and grants her enhanced powers.

Loki
Hela appears in the four-issue series Loki, in which Loki has claimed leadership of Asgard. It is revealed that Hela was one of the Asgardians that helped him to the throne, but is now demanding payment for her assistance, along with the seductress Lorelei.

Marvel Zombies
In the alternate Marvel Zombies universe, Loki seeking more mischief has induced a zombie wide apocalypse during World War II. A curious Odin makes the decision to investigate personally and is bitten by a zombie. As Odin shares a magical lifeblood with all Asgardians, they all also become zombies, including Hela.

In other media

Television
 Hela appears in The Avengers: Earth's Mightiest Heroes episode "The Fall of Asgard", voiced by Nika Futterman.
 Hela appears in the Avengers Assemble episode "Valhalla Can Wait", voiced by Vanessa Marshall. This version became the ruler of Valhalla instead of Hel and Niflheim.
 Hela appears in the Guardians of the Galaxy episode "Killer Queen", voiced by Kari Wahlgren. This version is the ruler of Niflheim whose powers are locked in a chest she is unable to open herself.

Film

 Hela appears in Hulk vs. Thor voiced by Janyse Jaud.
 Hela appears in Thor: Ragnarok, portrayed by Cate Blanchett. This version is the daughter of Odin instead of Loki, as well as the first Asgardian to wield Mjolnir. Additionally, she is portrayed as a formidable combatant, skilled with her Necroswords, and is able to summon various types of blades from within her cloak, in addition to being agile and physically powerful. Years prior, she helped Odin conquer the Nine Realms before he became alarmed by her ambitious and warmongering behavior. She was defeated in a battle that claimed all but one of the Valkyrie's lives and was locked away in an interdimensional prison in Hel, with Odin's life keeping her at bay. Once Odin dies in the present, she breaks free and thwarts an attack by Thor and Loki, during which she destroys Mjolnir and banishes her brothers to Sakaar. Upon arriving in Asgard, she kills the Warriors Three and the majority of its forces before resurrecting her original army and companion Fenris as well as appointing Skurge as her Executioner. However, Thor and Loki joins forces with the last Valkyrie and Bruce Banner to escape Sakaar and return to Asgard, where Thor engages his sister in battle while Loki secretly revives Surtur to initiate Ragnarök. Hela attempts to fight Surtur, but is ultimately killed by his Twilight Sword.

Video games
 Hela makes a cameo appearance in Hsien Ko's ending in Ultimate Marvel vs. Capcom 3.
 Hela appears as a boss in the Nintendo DS version of Thor: God of Thunder.
 Hela appears as a boss in Marvel: Avengers Alliance.
 Hela appears as a playable character in Marvel Future Fight.
 Hela appears as a playable character in Lego Marvel Super Heroes 2, voiced by Kate Kennedy.
 Hela appears as a playable character in Marvel Puzzle Quest.
 Hela appears as a boss in Marvel Ultimate Alliance 3: The Black Order, voiced again by Nika Futterman.
 Hela appears in Marvel Future Revolution as part of the "Dark Domain" storyline.

Miscellaneous
Hela appears in Thor & Loki: Blood Brothers, voiced by Katharine Chesterton.

References

External links
 Hela at MarvelDirectory.com
 Character Gallery Hela
 Hela at Marvel Database
 Hela at Comic Vine

Characters created by Jack Kirby
Characters created by Stan Lee
Comics characters introduced in 1964
Female characters in film
Female film villains
Fictional characters with death or rebirth abilities
Fictional characters with superhuman durability or invulnerability
Fictional deicides
Fictional goddesses
Fictional necromancers
Fictional soul collectors
Fictional swordfighters in comics
Fictional women soldiers and warriors
Film supervillains
Marvel Comics Asgardians
Marvel Comics characters who can move at superhuman speeds
Marvel Comics characters who can teleport
Marvel Comics characters who use magic
Marvel Comics characters with accelerated healing
Marvel Comics characters with superhuman strength
Marvel Comics female supervillains
Marvel Comics film characters
Marvel Comics giants
Marvel Comics telepaths
Underworld in popular culture
Villains in animated television series